Leptotes rabefaner, the Madagascar zebra blue, is a butterfly in the family Lycaenidae. It is found on Madagascar. The habitat consists of forests and forest margins.

References

Butterflies described in 1877
Leptotes (butterfly)
Butterflies of Africa
Taxa named by Paul Mabille